Mab-21 like 3 is a protein that in humans is encoded by the MAB21L3 gene.

References

Further reading